Djana Mata (born 13 August 1960) is an Albanian shooter who competed at the 1996 Summer Olympics and the 2000 Summer Olympics, her best finish was 11th.

References

External links

1960 births
Living people
Albanian female sport shooters
Shooters at the 1996 Summer Olympics
Shooters at the 2000 Summer Olympics
Olympic shooters of Albania
Place of birth missing (living people)